American singer and rapper Lauryn Hill has released one studio album, one live album, and 20 singles (including nine singles as a featured artist). She has also written for and performed on several other tracks.

Released on August 25, 1998, Hill's debut album The Miseducation of Lauryn Hill sold over 423,000 copies in its first week (boosted by advance radio play of two non-label-sanctioned singles, "Lost Ones" and "Can't Take My Eyes Off You") and topped the US Billboard 200 for four weeks and the US Top R&B/Hip-Hop Albums for six weeks. It went on to sell 10 million copies in the US, being certified Diamond by the Recording Industry Association of America, and 12 million copies worldwide. The lead single released from the album was "Doo Wop (That Thing)", which debuted at number one on the Billboard Hot 100. Other charted singles from the album were "Ex-Factor", "Everything Is Everything" and "To Zion".

During 2000, Hill dropped out of the public eye. In July 2001, while pregnant with her third child, Hill unveiled her new material to a small crowd, for a taping of an MTV Unplugged special. An album of the concert, titled MTV Unplugged No. 2.0, was released in May 2002 and featured only her singing and playing an acoustic guitar. 2.0 debuted at number three on the Billboard 200, However, it was certified platinum in the US on June 11, 2002.

Albums

Studio albums

Live albums

Compilation albums

Singles

As lead artist

As featured artist

Promotional singles

Other charted songs

Videography

Video albums

Music videos

As lead artist

As featured artist

Guest appearances

Notes

See also 
Fugees discography

References 

Discographies of American artists
Hip hop discographies
Discography
Rhythm and blues discographies